Manpreet Bambra (born 10 July 1992) is an English actress. She is known for her roles as Katie Lord on the CBBC series Wizards vs Aliens and Jade in the Netflix series Free Rein.

Early life and education
Bambra grew up in Water Oakley in Bray, Berkshire. She attended St. George's School, Ascot where she took LAMDA acting classes offered by the school. She was accepted to the National Youth Theatre. She took a gap year before university and later graduated with a Master of Science in Cosmetic Science from the London College of Fashion.

Career
Bambra made her acting debut in Our Time Alone, a short film in 2009, portraying the role of Harpreet. Between 2012 and 2014, Bambra played the recurring role of Katie Lord in CBBC drama Wizards Vs Aliens. Since then, Bambra had short stints in Corner Shop Show, Doctors, So Awkward, The Dumping Ground and Casualty. In 2017, Bambra began portraying the role of Jade in Netflix original series Free Rein. In October 2019, she made her third appearance in the BBC soap opera Doctors as Sonia Gill for one episode.

Filmography

References

External links 
 

Living people 
1992 births 
21st-century English actresses
Actresses from Berkshire
Actresses from London
Alumni of the London College of Fashion
English film actresses
English television actresses
National Youth Theatre members
People educated at St. George's School, Ascot
People from Bray, Berkshire
People from Ealing
British actresses of Indian descent